Peter Salamon is a mathematics professor at San Diego State University.  He has published 133 mathematical articles related to biomathematics, thermodynamics in finite time / geometrical thermodynamics, and optimization and mathematical modeling.

Publications

References

20th-century American mathematicians
21st-century American mathematicians
Living people
Year of birth missing (living people)